St. Ansgar's Church is a parish church of the Roman Catholic Church in Kristiansand, Norway. It is the only Roman Catholic church building in Agder county in Southern Norway. 

The first church was built in 1936. The current church building is built of red bricks and expanded, after total restoration after the first, whitewashed church burned in the 1980s. In addition to church services in Norwegian, it has a Mass in English every Sunday afternoon at 6 p.m.

History 
In 1890, the Catholic church in Kristiansand was established and the German Wilhelm Hartmann from Münster was the first pastor. Just after the church's founding, the Sisters of St. Joseph came to town and bought a property next to the rectory. For nearly 100 years, they were an indispensable support for the fragile new church. During the reconstruction after the major town fire in 1892, they purchased several more properties, and established a Catholic hospital in the town, St Joseph's Hospital, which operated until 1967.

The first church was built in 1935 and was consecrated in 1936. The current church was built and expanded on the same plot.

Initially, the growing of number of church members was slow. However, the situation is completely different today, because the church is experiencing a strong growth, mainly because the relocation of Catholics of foreign origin have risen sharply.

References 

Churches in Kristiansand
1890 establishments in Norway
Religious organizations established in 1890
20th-century Roman Catholic church buildings in Norway
Roman Catholic churches completed in 1936